The act of restoration of the Ukrainian state or proclamation of the Ukrainian state of June 30, 1941 was announced by the Organization of Ukrainian Nationalists (OUN)  under the leadership of Stepan Bandera, who declared an independent Ukrainian State in Lviv. The prime-minister was Yaroslav Stetsko, and the head of Council of Seniors was Kost Levytsky.

The OUN intended to take advantage of the retreat of Soviet forces from Ukraine. Their leaders thought that  their movement had found a new powerful ally in Nazi Germany to aid them in their struggle against the Soviet Union. Ukrainians began a series of pogroms against Jews in early July murdering men, women and children and raping, disrobing, and sexually assaulting young Jewish women and girls.Days after the Nazi invasion of Lviv, however, the leadership of the newly formed government was arrested and sent to concentration camps in Germany.

Background

Ukrainian Territory Between World Wars
After World War I, Ukraine was divided into three parts: most of Central and Eastern Ukraine became the Ukrainian Soviet Socialist Republic in 1921. The capital was Kharkiv.

The majority of current Western Ukraine became part of the Second Polish Republic. This included the city of Lviv, which at the time was the center of Ukrainian nationalist activity.

A small part of current far Western Ukraine, the Zakarpattia, became part of Czechoslovakia. Northern Bukovina belonged to Romania.

The Ukrainian Nationalist Movement in Western Ukraine
For various reasons, the Ukrainian nationalist movement was more active in Western Ukraine than in Central Ukraine in the inter-war period.
At the end of World War I, veterans of the Sich Riflemen created the Ukrainian Military Organization in 1920 to promote the creation of an independent Ukrainian state. The leader was Yevhen Konovalets.

The Organization of Ukrainian Nationalists - the OUN
In 1929, the Ukrainian Military Organization became the Organization of Ukrainian Nationalists. The first leader was Bohdan Kravciv. The stated goal of the OUN was the creation of an independent Ukrainian State.

In 1940, the OUN suffered a split into two groups - one group supported Andriy Melnyk (this group became known as the OUN-M, or "Melnykivtsi"), while the other group supported Stepan Bandera (this group became known as the OUN-B, or Banderivtsi). The OUN-B was considered the more radical of the two.

Prelude to the Declaration

The OUN realized that an opportunity was available to fulfill their mandated plan: the creation of a new independent Ukraine.

On June 22, 1941, the Ukrainian National Committee (Ukrayinsky Natsionalny' Komitet; UNK) was created in Kraków, with Volodymyr Horbovy as a president. The UNK published an essay, "Memorial", which outlined the plans of the OUN to declare independence. This essay was met with severe disapproval of the Nazi authorities, and the leaders of the UNK, Horbovy and Bandera, were told to rescind the document. They refused, and made their way to Lviv.

On June 26, 1941, Soviet forces fled from Lviv, and the Ukrainian Nachtigall Battalion, led by its commander Roman Shukhevych, entered the city in triumph to cheering crowds of joyful Ukrainians. With the departure of the Soviet Red Army, the OUN set up its headquarters in Lviv, and began to prepare for the big day.

Preamble
In his memoirs Vasyl Kuk said:

Text

Government

After the proclamation of the Ukrainian independence a government was announced. This government included politicians from various parties, as well as political ideologies. They were:

Prime Minister Yaroslav Stetsko (OUN)
Deputy Prime Minister Markian Panchyshyn (no political affiliation)
Deputy Prime Minister Lev Rebet (OUN)
Minister of Interior Volodymyr Lysy (Socialist Radical Party)
Deputy Minister of Interior Konstantyn Pankivsky  (Socialist Radical Party)
Minister of External Affairs Volodymyr Stakhiv (OUN)
Deputy Minister of External Affairs Oleksandr Maritchak (Ukrainian National-Democratic Party)
Minister of Defense Vsevolod Petriv (Social Revolutionary Party)
Deputy Minister of Defense Roman Shukhevych (OUN)
Deputy Minister of Defense Oleksandr Hasyn (OUN)
Minister of State Security Mykola Lebed (OUN)
Minister of Justice Yulian Fedusevych (no political affiliation)
Deputy Minister of Justice Bohdan Dzerovych (no political affiliation)
Secretary of the Ministry of National Economy Dmytro Yatsiv (OUN)
Secretary of the Ministry of National Economy Roman Ilnytsky (OUN)
Minister of Agriculture Yevhen Khraplyvy (Ukrainian National-Democratic Party)
Deputy Minister of Agriculture Andriy Piasetsky (Front of National Unity)
Minister of Health Markian Panchyshyn (no political affiliation)
Deputy Minister of Health Roman Osinchuk
Secretary of the Ministry of Health Oleksandr Barvinsky (no political affiliation)
Minister of Education Volodymyr Radzykevych (no political affiliation)
Minister of Communication N. Moroz (no political affiliation)
Minister of Information Oleksandr Hai-Holovko (no political affiliation)
Secretary of the Ministry of Information Osyp Pozychaniuk (OUN)
Secretary of the Ministry of Information Yaroslav Starukh (OUN)
Minister of Political Coordination Ivan Klymiv-Lehenda (OUN)
Director of Government Administration Mykhailo Rosliak (Socialist Radical Party)

A Council of Seniors headed by Kost Levytsky as president was also formed.

Reactions to the proclamation

Reaction in Ukraine
The act of proclamation was broadcast by Yaroslav Stetsko over the radio in Lviv, which made many believe it was supported by the advancing German troops. The act received immediate support from several Ukrainian church officials such as Metropolitan Archbishop Andrey Sheptytsky and Bishop Hryhoriy Khomyshyn of the Ukrainian Greek Catholic Church, Metropolitan Bishop Polikarp Sikorsky of the Ukrainian Autocephalous Orthodox Church.

Apparently convinced that the group of Stetsko had the backing of the Germans, Metropolitan wrote a pastoral letter in which he exhorted the people to support the newly proclaimed government "the scarifies which the final attainment of our goals require demand above all dutiful obedience to the just orders of the government which do not conflict with God’s law."
Moreover, he declared:

We greet the victorious German Army as deliver from enemy. We render our obedient homage to the government which has been erected. We recognize Mr.Yaroslav Stetsko as Head of State Administration of Ukraine.

The pastoral letter was read over the radio by chaplain of Nachtigall Battalion Father Hryn’okh the same morning. It appeared to have removed any doubts which may have been lingering in the mind of most prominent Ukrainians in Lviv concerning the origin of the Stets’ko government.

Supporters of Ukrainian independence have been divided in their assessment of the proclamation. Some considered it brilliant, others considered it reckless or even foolish.

Reaction by the German Government
The Declaration of Independence took the German authorities completely by surprise, and they saw it as an attempted coup. When Nazi troops entered Lviv, the German authorities told the leadership of the Ukrainian government to disband. However, it did not, and in reprisal the leaders of the government were arrested and interned in the Sachsenhausen concentration camp. These included President Yaroslav Stetsko, and Stepan Bandera.

Within two years of the declaration, the Nazis had imprisoned or killed 80% of OUN-B leadership.

Post-war reaction to the Declaration

Some Ukrainian groups downplayed the early cooperation between the Ukrainian nationalist parties and the Nazis. They emphasized how Ukrainian nationalists fought both the Germans and the Soviets, and how the Ukrainian nation suffered enormously at the hands of both.

Notes

References

Sources
Hai-Nyzhnyk P. P. The attitude of senior management of the German Reich to the Act of the Ukrainian state in 1941 and the military-political tactics of the OUN(r) in 1941–1943.– Collection of scientific works "Gileya: scientific bulletin" , Kyiv: National Pedagogical University named after MP Drahomanov; VGO Ukrainian Academy of Sciences, 2015.— Issue.98 (No. 7) .— P. 49–65.

Organization of Ukrainian Nationalists
Political history of Ukraine
1941 in Ukraine
1941
1941 documents